Bergensposten is a defunct newspaper published in Bergen, Norway from 1 March 1854 until 1893 when it merged with Bergens Tidende. The editor at the start was Johannes Steen who later became prime minister of Norway.

References

1854 establishments in Norway
1893 disestablishments in Norway
Defunct newspapers published in Norway
Newspapers published in Bergen
Norwegian-language newspapers
Newspapers established in 1854
Publications disestablished in 1893